Montévrain is a commune in the Seine-et-Marne department in the Île-de-France region in north-central France.

Demographics
Inhabitants are known as Montévrinois.

Education
The commune has the following school groups (combined preschool and elementary schools): Groupe scolaire Le Verger, Groupe Scolaire Le Puits du Gué, Groupe scolaire Eugène Isabey, and Groupe scolaire Louis de Vion.

The commune is developing its own junior high school scheduled to open in fall 2018. In the meantime junior high school students are sent to either Collège du Vieux Chene in Chessy or the collège provisoire in Serris.

Area senior high schools/sixth-form colleges:
 Lycée Van Dongen - Lagny-sur-Marne
 Lycée Emilie du Chatelet - Serris
 Lycée Auguste Perdonnnet - Thorigny-sur-Marne

See also
Communes of the Seine-et-Marne department

References

External links

Official site 
1999 Land Use, from IAURIF (Institute for Urban Planning and Development of the Paris-Île-de-France région) 

Communes of Seine-et-Marne
Val de Bussy